Anagrus epos is a species of fairyfly which has been proposed as a biological control agent against Homalodisca vitripennis.

References

Mymaridae
Insects described in 1911